Pacecco De Rosa (byname of Giovanni Francesco De Rosa; 17 December 1607 - 1656) was an Italian painter, active in Naples.

Biography
He was a contemporary of Massimo Stanzione or, according to others, a pupil of him. De Rosa was influenced by his father-in-law, Filippo Vitale, also a painter: this is shown in his earlier works, such as a Deposition now in the Museum of the Certosa di San Martino. Also in the Certosa is a St. Nicholas of Bari and Basilius (1636), showing influences of both Stanzione and Domenichino, who was in Naples from 1631.

Attributed to De Rosa is a series portraying the Madonna with Child (one in Museum of the Certosa di San Martino; one in the church of Santa Marta, Naples; and one in the National Gallery of Prague). Of the 1640s is a painting, in collaboration with Vitale, of the Madonna with St. Charles Borromeo in the church of San Domenico Maggiore. His other works include an Annunciation  in San Gregorio Armeno, St. Thomas of Aquino in Santa Maria della Sanità and the later Massacre of the Innocents in the Museum of Philadelphia and Diana Bathing in the Capodimonte Museum.

Among the artists thought to be in his circle are Girolamo De Magistro.

He died in Naples in 1656.

Gallery

Sources

External links

Guide to De Rosa's works 
Orazio and Artemisia Gentileschi, a fully digitized exhibition catalog from The Metropolitan Museum of Art Libraries, which contains material on Pacecco De Rosa (see index)

1607 births
1656 deaths
17th-century Neapolitan people
17th-century Italian painters
Italian male painters
Painters from Naples